Trstenjak is a Slovenian surname. Notable people with the surname include:

Anton Trstenjak (1906–1996), Slovenian psychologist, theologian and author
Ante Trstenjak (1894–1970), Slovenian psychologist, painter and illustrator
Davorin Trstenjak (1817–1890), Slovenian writer, historian and Roman Catholic priest
Tina Trstenjak (born 1990), Slovenian judoka
Verica Trstenjak (born 1962), Slovenian lawyer and judge

Slovene-language surnames